Four main books of Biographical-Evaluation, is a book, written by Seyyed Ali Khamenei (in 1990); which is concerning a general view on Biographical evaluation, that is among the (Islamic) specialized sciences.

Content
The book of Four main books of Biographical Evaluation which was published by "Daftare-Nashre Farhange-Eslami" (Islamic Culture Publishing Office) in 1990, is engaged in diverse items, among: a general surveying to the Biographical evaluation, its definition, history, a brief consideration, ... and engaging in the books of Rejali. This book also introduces two of those four books, namely: "Ekhtiar-Ma'refah-alrejal" and Sheikh Tusi's "Fehrest Kotobal-Shia Wa-Osulahom Walasma al-Mosnafin Wa-Ashabol-Osul" (i.e.: List of Shiite books and their principles and the names of the authors and the companions of the principles"). In the meanwhile, it postponed the other two books to be surveyed in future.

See also

 Ruhe-Tawhid, Nafye Obudiate GheireKhoda
 An Outline of Islamic Thought in the Quran
 Works of Seyyed Ali Khamenei
 The 250 years old man
 Palestine (2011 book)

References

1990 non-fiction books
Ali Khamenei
Shia Islam
Iranian books